Public College, Samana is a higher education institute located in Samana, Punjab, India. The college has been affiliated to Punjabi University, Patiala. Public College offers various Graduation and Post Graduation courses in humanities, commerce, computers and agriculture.

Campus
The institute has various departments covering Humanities, Computers, Commerce, Agriculture and many others.

Courses Offered
Graduation Courses
Bachelor of Arts (B.A.)
Bachelor of Commerce (B.Com.)
Bachelor of Commerce (Professional) (B.Com.(Professional))
Bachelor of Computer Applications (B.C.A.)
Bachelor of Science (Agriculture) (B.Sc. (Agriculture))(First College in Patiala district offering this course)
Bachelor of Business Administration (B.B.A.)
Bachelor of Science (Medical & Non-Medical) (B.Sc.)

Post Graduation Courses
Master of Arts (Punjabi) (M.A. Punjabi)
Master of Arts (English) (M.A. English)
Master of Arts (History) (M.A. History)
Master of Commerce (M.Com.)
Master of Science (Information Technology) (M.Sc. (IT))
Post Graduate Diploma in Computer Applications (P.G.D.C.A.)

Patiala district
Universities and colleges in Punjab, India